Zhang Lianbiao (born 25 January 1969) is a retired male javelin thrower from PR China. He set his personal best (83.38 metres) on 16 October 1994 in Hiroshima.

Seasonal bests by year
1991 - 78.94
1992 - 75.42
1994 - 83.38
1996 - 80.96
1997 - 73.16
1998 - 78.95
2000 - 78.85
2001 - 80.72

Achievements

References

1969 births
Living people
Chinese male javelin throwers
Athletes (track and field) at the 1994 Asian Games
Athletes (track and field) at the 1998 Asian Games
Athletes (track and field) at the 1992 Summer Olympics
Athletes (track and field) at the 1996 Summer Olympics
Olympic athletes of China
Asian Games medalists in athletics (track and field)
Universiade medalists in athletics (track and field)
Asian Games gold medalists for China
Asian Games silver medalists for China
Medalists at the 1994 Asian Games
Medalists at the 1998 Asian Games
Universiade gold medalists for China
Medalists at the 1995 Summer Universiade
20th-century Chinese people